Janet Frances Thompson (born 21 February 1954) married name Janet Kane, is a female former athlete who competed for England.

Athletics career
Thompson was a three times National Champion after winning the 1976, 1977 and 1979 AAA National Championship title in the discus.

She represented England in the discus, at the 1978 Commonwealth Games in Edmonton, Alberta, Canada.

References

1954 births
English female shot putters
English female discus throwers
Athletes (track and field) at the 1978 Commonwealth Games
Living people
Commonwealth Games competitors for England